Guy Butler may refer to:

 Guy Butler (athlete) (1899–1981), British runner
 Guy Butler (poet) (1918–2001), South African poet and writer